The California Young Reader Medal is a set of five annual literary awards conferred upon picture books and fiction books selected by vote of California schoolchildren from a ballot prepared by committee. The program was established in 1974 with Intermediate, Primary, and Young Adult Medals that were inaugurated in 1975, 1976, and 1977 and were conferred biennially, and annually beginning in 1983.

The program is intended to encourage recreational reading and is sponsored by four organizations that promote reading and literacy: the California Association of Teachers of English, the California Library Association, the California Reading Association, and the California School Library Association.

There are five medals, last modified for 2002: Primary (grades K-3), Intermediate (grades 3–6), Middle School/Junior High (grades 6–9), Young Adult (grades 9–12), and Picture Books for Older Readers (grades 4 and up)—that is, roughly age 10 and up. Both writer and illustrator receive the Primary and Picture Book Medals, where applicable.

The ballot for each medal comprises 3–5 books published during the preceding four years—two to five years ago when the process concludes. For example, 17 books published from 2010 to 2013 were nominated for 2014–2015.

Rules and process

Young readers, their parents, educators, librarians, and "anyone who works with young people" may recommend books. Candidates must be original works of fiction by living authors, available in English, published during the four preceding years and still in print.

Nominations are made by award category and the books should be "often read or requested" and have "strong appeal for the age group".
A committee of the sponsoring organizations selects "a well-balanced list of nominees" (finalists), considering merit and appeal.

Children may vote in all categories where they know all of the candidates by reading or hearing read aloud. They cast a combined paper ballot at once, in a classroom or library monitored by an adult.

Winners

The medals in four categories inaugurated in 1975, 1976, 1977, and 1980 were biennial until 1983, and thereafter annual. For each category (now five) CYRM maintains a "Booklist" of finalists (3–5 annually) that provides basic bibliographic data for all, and cover images beginning in 2005 or so.

1970s
1975
 Intermediate: How to Eat Fried Worms, by Thomas Rockwell

1976
 Primary: How Droofus the Dragon Lost His Head, by Bill Peet

1977
 Intermediate: Freaky Friday, by Mary Rodgers
 Young Adult: Watership Down, by Richard Adams

1978
 Primary: Little Rabbit's Loose Tooth, written by Lucy Bate, illustrated by Diane de Groat

1979
 Intermediate: Danny, the Champion of the World, by Roald Dahl
 Young Adult: The Late Great Me, by Sandra Scoppettone

1980s

1980
 Primary: Big Bad Bruce, by Bill Peet
 Middle School/Junior High: The Pinballs, by Betsy Byars

1981
 Intermediate: Summer of the Monkeys, by Wilson Rawls
 Young Adult: A Summer to Die, by Lois Lowry

1982
 Primary: Miss Nelson is Missing, written by Harry Allard, illustrated by James Marshall
 Middle School/Junior High: Hail, Hail Camp Timberwood, by Ellen Conford

1983
 Primary: Liza Lou and the Yeller Belly Swamp, by Mercer Mayer
 Intermediate: Superfudge, by Judy Blume
 Middle School/Junior High: Tiger Eyes, by Judy Blume
 Young Adult: Summer of Fear, by Lois Duncan

1984
 Primary: Bagdad Ate It, written by Phyllis Green, illustrated by Joel Schick
 Intermediate: The Trouble with Tuck, by Theodore Taylor
 Middle School/Junior High: There's a Bat in Bunk Five, by Paula Danziger
 Young Adult: Stranger with My Face, by Lois Duncan

1985
 Primary: Herbie's Troubles, written by Carol Chapman, illustrated by Kelly Oechsli
 Intermediate: The Indian in the Cupboard, by Lynne Reid Banks
 Middle School/Junior High: Taking Terri Mueller, by Norma Fox Mazer
 Young Adult: The Truth Trap, by Frances Miller

1986
 Primary: Space Case, written by Edward Marshall, illustrated by James Marshall
 Intermediate: Nothing's Fair in Fifth Grade, by Barthe DeClements
 Middle School/Junior High: Girl with the Silver Eyes, by Willo Davis Roberts
 Young Adult: The Darkangel, by Meredith Pierce

Beginning in 1987, the illustrators of Primary Award-winning books have officially received full recognition alongside the writers.

1987
 Primary: The Napping House, written by Audrey Wood, illustrated by Don Wood
 Intermediate: The Dollhouse Murders, by Betty Ren Wright
 Middle School/Junior High: You Shouldn't Have to Say Goodbye, by Patricia Hermes
 Young Adult: Pursuit, by Michael French

1988
 Primary: If You Give a Mouse a Cookie, written by Laura Joffe Numeroff, illustrated by Felicia Bond
 Intermediate: Be a Perfect Person in Just Three Days, by Stephen Manes
 Middle School/Junior High: The Root Cellar, by Janet Lunn
 Young Adult, Interstellar Pig, by William Sleator

1989
 Primary: What Happened to Patrick's Dinosaurs?, written by Carol Carrick, illustrated by Donald Carrick
 Intermediate: The Castle in the Attic, by Elizabeth Winthrop
 Middle School/Junior High: The Stalker, by Joan Lowery Nixon
 Young Adult: The Face at the Edge of the World, by Eve Bunting

1990s

1990
 Primary: Eyes of the Dragon, written by Margaret Leaf, illustrated by Ed Young
 Intermediate: The War with Grandpa, by Robert Kimmel Smith
 Middle School/Junior High: The Other Side of Dark, by Joan Lowery Nixon
 Young Adult: Izzy, Willy Nilly, by Cynthia Voigt

1991
 Primary: Tacky the Penguin, written by Helen Lester, illustrated by Lynn M. Munsinger
 Intermediate: Harry's Mad, by Dick King-Smith
 Middle School/Junior High: December Stillness, by Mary Downing Hahn
 Young Adult: Night Kites, by M.E. Kerr

1992
 Primary: Never Spit on Your Shoes, by Denys Cazet
 Intermediate: All About Sam, by Lois Lowry
 Middle School/Junior High: Sniper, by Theodore Taylor
 Young Adult: A Sudden Silence, by Eve Bunting

1993
 Primary: Julius, the Baby of the World, by Kevin Henkes
 Intermediate: Fudge-a-Mania, by Judy Blume
 Middle School/Junior High: Something Upstairs, by Avi
 Young Adult: The Silver Kiss, by Annette Curtis Klause

1994
 Primary: High-Wire Henry, written by Mary Calhoun, illustrated by Erick Ingraham
 Intermediate: Scared Stiff, by Willo Davis Roberts
 Middle School/Junior High: There's a Girl in My Hammerlock, by Jerry Spinelli
 Young Adult: We All Fall Down, by Robert Cormier

1995
 Primary: Martha Speaks, by Susan Meddaugh
 Intermediate: Stonewords, by Pam Conrad
 Middle School/Junior High: Rescue Josh McGuire, by Ben Mikaelsen
 Young Adult: Downriver, by Will Hobbs

1996
 Primary: Stellaluna, by Janell Cannon
 Intermediate: Time for Andrew, by Mary Downing Hahn
 Middle School/Junior High: Freak the Mighty, by Rodman Philbrick
 Young Adult: Shadow of the Dragon, by Sherry Garland

1997
 Primary: Don't Fidget a Feather!, written by Erica Silverman, illustrated by S. D. Schindler
 Intermediate: Jennifer Murdley's Toad, by Bruce Coville
 Middle School/Junior High: Sparrow Hawk Red, by Ben Mikaelsen
 Young Adult: Staying Fat for Sarah Byrnes, by Chris Crutcher

1998 
 Primary: Dog Breath, by Dav Pilkey
 Intermediate: The Junkyard Dog, by Erika Tamar
 Middle School/Junior High: The Watsons Go to Birmingham – 1963, by Christopher Paul Curtis
 Young Adult: Ironman, by Chris Crutcher

1999 
 Primary: Livingstone Mouse, written by Pamela Duncan Edwards, illustrated by Henry Cole
 Intermediate: The 13th Floor, written by Sid Fleischman, illustrated by Peter Sis
 Middle School/Junior High: Under the Blood Red Sun, by Graham Salisbury
 Young Adult: The Only Alien on the Planet, by Kristen Randle

2000s

2000
 Primary: Lost, written by Paul Brett Johnson and Celeste Lewis, illustrated by Johnson
 Intermediate: Riding Freedom, by Pam Muñoz Ryan
 Middle School/Junior High: Ella Enchanted, by Gail Carson Levine
 Young Adult: Breaking Bones, by A. M. Jenkins

2001
 Primary: Grandpa's Teeth, by Rod Clement
 Intermediate: Honus & Me, by Dan Gutman
 Middle School/Junior High: Among the Hidden, by Margaret Peterson Haddix
 Young Adult: Armageddon Summer, by Jane Yolen and Bruce Coville

2002
 Primary: Hooway for Wodney Wat, written by Helen Lester, illustrated by Lynn M. Munsinger
 Intermediate: The Million Dollar Shot, by Dan Gutman
 Middle School/Junior High: Joey Pigza Swallowed the Key, by Jack Gantos
 Young Adult: Bad, by Jean Ferris
 Picture Books for Older Readers: Weslandia, by Paul Fleischman

2003
 Primary: I Will Never, Not Ever, Eat a Tomato, by Lauren Child
 Intermediate: Because of Winn-Dixie, by Kate DiCamillo
 Middle School/Junior High: Touching Spirit Bear, by Ben Mikaelsen
 Young Adult: Define "Normal", by Julie Anne Peters
 Picture Books for Older Readers: The Babe and I, by David A. Adler

2004
 Primary: A Fine, Fine School, written by Sharon Creech, illustrated by Harry Bliss
 Intermediate: The School Story, by Andrew Clements
 Middle School/Junior High: Flipped, by Wendelin Van Draanen
 Young Adult: Ties that Bind, Ties that Break, by Lensey Namioka
 Picture Books for Older Readers: And the Dish Ran Away with the Spoon, by Janet Stevens

2005
 Primary: Muncha! Muncha! Muncha!, written by Candace Fleming, illustrated by G. Brian Karas
 Intermediate: Ruby Holler, by Sharon Creech
 Middle School/Junior High: Things Not Seen, by Andrew Clements
 Young Adult: Stormbreaker, by Anthony Horowitz
 Picture Books for Older Readers: Mr. Lincoln's Way, by Patricia Polacco

2006
 Primary: Miss Smith's Incredible Storybook, by Michael Garland
 Intermediate: The Good Dog, by Avi
 Middle School/Junior High: 12 Again, by Sue Corbett
 Young Adult: After, by Francine Prose
 Picture Books for Older Readers: Boxes for Katje, written by Candace Fleming, illustrated by Stacey Dressen-McQueen

2007
 Primary: My Lucky Day, by Keiko Kasza
 Intermediate: Christopher Mouse, by William Wise
 Middle School/Junior High: Al Capone Does My Shirts, by Gennifer Choldenko
 Young Adult: Shattering Glass, by Gail Giles
 Picture Books for Older Readers: The Cats in Krasinski Square, written by Karen Hesse, illustrated by Wendy Watson

2008
 Primary: Superdog: The Heart of a Hero, written by Caralyn Buehner, illustrated by Mark Buehner
 Intermediate: Each Little Bird That Sings, by Deborah Wiles
 Middle School/Junior High: The Schwa Was Here, by Neal Shusterman
 Young Adult: Private Peaceful, by Michael Morpurgo
 Picture Books for Older Readers: Mr. Maxwell's Mouse, written by Frank Asch, illustrated by Devin Asch

2009
 Primary: Stanley's Wild Ride, written by Linda Bailey, illustrated by Bill Slavin
 Intermediate: Sheep, by Valerie Hobbs
 Middle School/Junior High: Heat, by Mike Lupica
 Young Adult: Sold, by Patricia McCormick
 Picture Books for Older Readers: Mystery at the Club Sandwich, written and illustrated by Doug Cushman

2010s

2010
 Primary: Millie Waits for the Mail, by Alexander Steffensmeier
 Intermediate: No Talking, by Andrew Clements
 Middle School/Junior High: Alabama Moon, by Watt Key
 Young Adult: The Absolutely True Diary of a Part-Time Indian, by Sherman Alexie
 Picture Books for Older Readers: Owney: The Mail-Pouch Pooch, written by Mona Kerby, illustrated by Lynne Barasch

2011
 Primary: Martina the Beautiful Cockroach, written by Carmen Agra Deedy, illustrated by Michael Austin
 Intermediate: Zorgamazoo, by Robert Paul Weston
 Middle School/Junior High: Cracker: The Best Dog in Vietnam, by Cynthia Kadohata
 Young Adult: The Hunger Games, by Suzanne Collins
 Picture Books for Older Readers: John, Paul, George & Ben, written and illustrated by Lane Smith

2012
 Primary: I Need My Monster, written by Amanda Noll, illustrated by Howard McWilliam
 Intermediate: Violet Raines Almost Got Struck by Lightning, by Danette Haworth
 Middle School/Junior High: Every Soul a Star, by Wendy Mass.
 Young Adult: Graceling, by Kristin Cashore
 Picture Books for Older Readers: Henry's Freedom Box, written by Ellen Levine, illustrated by Kadir Nelson

2013
 Primary: We Are in a Book!, written and illustrated by Mo Willems
 Intermediate: The Giant Slayer, by Iain Lawrence
 Middle School/Junior High: Out of My Mind, by Sharon Draper 
 Young Adult: Matched, by Ally Condie
 Picture Books for Older Readers: Nubs: The True Story of a Mutt, a Marine and a Miracle, written by Major Brian Dennis, Kirby Larson, and Mary Nethery, illustrated with photographs by members of the Marines team

2014
 Primary: Press Here, written and illustrated by Herve Tullet
 Intermediate: The Unwanteds, by Lisa McMann
 Middle School/Junior High: Wonderstruck, by Brian Selznick
 Young Adult: Divergent, by Veronica Roth
 Picture Books for Older Readers: Queen of the Falls, written and illustrated by Chris Van Allsburg

2015
 Primary: Exclamation Mark, written by Amy Krouse Rosenthal, illustrated by Tom Lichtenheld 
 Intermediate: Wonder, by R. J. Palacio 
 Middle School/Junior High: The False Prince, by Jennifer A. Nielsen 
 Young Adult: The Fault in Our Stars, by John Green 
 Picture Books for Older Readers: Brothers at Bat: The True Story of an Amazing All-Brother Team, written by Audrey Vernick, illustrated by Steven Salerno 

2016
 Primary: The Day the Crayons Quit, written by Drew Daywalt, illustrated by Oliver Jeffers 
 Intermediate: A Dog Called Homeless, by Sarah Lean 
 Middle School/Junior High: Dogtag Summer, by Elizabeth Partridge
 Young Adult: Cinder, by Marissa Meyer
 Picture Books for Older Readers: Helen's Big World: The Life of Helen Keller, written by Doreen Rappaport, illustrated by Matt Tavares

2017
 Primary: Sam & Dave Dig a Hole, written by Mac Barnett, illustrated by Jon Klassen 
 Intermediate: Escape from Mr. Lemoncello's Library, by Chris Grabenstein 
 Middle School/Junior High: Keeper of the Lost Cities, by Shannon Messenger
 Young Adult: Red Queen, by Victoria Aveyard
 Picture Books for Older Readers: Each Kindness, written by Jacqueline Woodson, illustrated by E. B. Lewis

2018
 Primary: The Book with No Pictures, by B. J. Novak 
 Intermediate: Pax, written by Sara Pennypacker, illustrated by Jon Klassen 
 Middle School/Junior High: A Night Divided, by Jennifer A. Nielsen
 Young Adult: Salt to the Sea, by Ruta Sepetys
 Picture Books for Older Readers: Barbed Wire Baseball, written by Marissa Moss, illustrated by Yuko Shimizu

2019
 Primary: The Bear and the Piano, written and illustrated by David Litchfield
 Intermediate: The War That Saved My Life, by Kimberly Brubaker Bradley 
 Middle School/Junior High: Echo, by Pam Muñoz Ryan
 Young Adult: Written in the Stars, by Aisha Saeed
 Picture Books for Older Readers: Emmanuel's Dream: The True Story of Emmanuel Ofosu Yeboah, written by Laurie Ann Thompson, illustrated by Sean Qualls

2020s

2020
 Primary: The Legend of Rock, Paper, Scissors, written by Drew Daywalt, illustrated by Adam Rex 
 Intermediate: The War I Finally Won, by Kimberly Brubaker Bradley 
 Middle School/Junior High: Refugee, by Alan Gratz
 Young Adult: Scythe, by Neal Shusterman
 Picture Books for Older Readers: Her Right Foot, written by Dave Eggers, illustrated by Shawn Harris

2021
 Primary: Poor Louie, written and illustrated by Tony Fucile 
 Intermediate: Restart, by Gordon Korman 
 Middle School/Junior High: Lily and Dunkin, by Donna Gephart
 Young Adult: All We Have Left, by Wendy Mills
 Picture Books for Older Readers: Sergeant Reckless, written by Patricia McCormick, illustrated by Iacopo Bruno

Notes

References

American children's literary awards
Awards established in 1974
1974 establishments in California
California education-related lists
California culture